Zawiszyn may refer to the following places:
Zawiszyn, Kuyavian-Pomeranian Voivodeship (north-central Poland)
Zawiszyn, Masovian Voivodeship (east-central Poland)
Zawiszyn, Warmian-Masurian Voivodeship (north Poland)